Alexander Leslie Elliott (September 14, 1902 – 1975) was a lawyer and politician in Ontario, Canada. He represented Peterborough in the Legislative Assembly of Ontario from 1937 to 1943 as a Liberal.

The son of Edward Morrow Elliott and Isabella Lavinia FItzgerald, he was born in Smith township, Peterborough County and was educated in Peterborough and at Osgoode Hall Law School.

References 

1921 births
1975 deaths
Ontario Liberal Party MPPs